Dight is an English surname, meaning 'to equip'. It is an occupational surname for the servant who dressed a knight before a battle or tournament.

Notable people with the surname include:

Charles Dight (Australian businessman)
Charles Fremont Dight (1856–1938), American academic and eugenicist
John Butler Dight (c. 1760 – 1854), Canadian politician

See also
Dights Falls, Melbourne, Victoria, Australia

References